Campanula alaskana is a species of flowering plant in the family Campanulaceae, native to north-western North America (the Aleutian Islands, Alaska, the Yukon, British Columbia, Washington state). It was first described by Asa Gray in 1886 as Campanula rotundifolia var. alaskana and elevated to a full species by William Wright in 1918.

References

alaskana
Flora of the Aleutian Islands
Flora of Alaska
Flora of Yukon
Flora of British Columbia
Flora of Washington (state)
Plants described in 1886
Flora without expected TNC conservation status